The Trail Menorca Camí de Cavalls (also referred to as TMCdC) is a single-staged ultramarathon race held in the island of Menorca, Spain.

It is a qualifying race for the Ultra-Trail du Mont-Blanc, allowing currently the acquisition of 4 qualification points.

Organization
The first edition was held between 18 and 20 May 2012 and in total more than 270 participants took part in it. After that, the number of participants has been continuously increasing every year.

Events
It is divided in five different events: 
It gives 4 qualification points for the Ultra-Trail du Mont-Blanc. 
Trail Costa Nord (TMCN) is between 90 and 100 km, depending on the edition, and it covers the north side of the island from Ciutadella until Es Castell. The total elevation gain is around 1800 m. It gives 2 qualification points for the Ultra-Trail du Mont-Blanc.
Trail Costa Sud (TMCS) is between 85 and 91 km, depending on the edition, and it covers the south side of the island from Es Castell until Ciutadella. The total elevation gain is around 1100 m. It gives 2 qualification points for the Ultra-Trail du Mont-Blanc.
Trekking Costa Nord (TCN) covers a part of the north side of the island. The distance and total elevation gain changes from one year to another.
Trekking Costa Sud (TCS) covers a part of the south side of the island. The distance and total elevation gain changes from one year to another.

Past winners

Trail Camí de Cavalls - 185.3 km

* The 185 km race of the 2021 edition was split into two legs, as due to a COVID-19-related curfew it was not allowed to run during the night.

Other events

Trail Costa Nord

Trail Costa Sud

Trekking Costa Nord

Trekking Costa Sud

References

External links 
 Official website
 Trail Menorca Camí de Cavalls on Facebook

Ultramarathons
Athletics competitions in Spain
Sport in Menorca